The women's high jump event at the 1987 Summer Universiade was held at the Stadion Maksimir in Zagreb on 13 and 14 July 1987.

Medalists

Results

Qualification

Final

References

Athletics at the 1987 Summer Universiade
1987